Kismath may refer to:
 Kismath (2016 film), an Indian Malayalam-language romantic drama film
 Kismath (2018 film), an Indian Kannada-language black comedy film

See also
 Kismat (disambiguation)
 Kismet (disambiguation)